Ellery Ronald Balcombe (born 15 October 1999) is an English professional footballer who plays as a goalkeeper for  club Bristol Rovers, on loan from  club Brentford. He is a product of the Brentford academy and was capped by England at youth level.

Club career

Brentford

Youth years (2014–2018) 
A goalkeeper, Balcombe began his career as a youth with Bedford Panthers and Stevenage, before joining the academy and the Elite U19 Education and Football Programme at Brentford. He was a part of the U15 team which won the Junior Globe at the 2014 Milk Cup. While still an U16, he broke into the youth team during the second half of the 2015–16 season, making six appearances and he also made four Development Squad appearances.

At the end of the 2015–16 season, Balcombe was promoted into the new Brentford B team and signed his first professional contract on 15 October 2016. Three weeks later, he won his maiden first team call up for a West London derby with Fulham, after second-choice goalkeeper Jack Bonham suffered whiplash in a car accident and remained an unused substitute during the 2–0 defeat. He played in the majority of the B team's matches during the 2016–17 season and helped the team to win the 2017 Kai Thor Cup. Balcombe was the undisputed first choice goalkeeper for the B team during the 2017–18 season and made 30 appearances. He received his only first team call up of the season for an FA Cup third round match versus Notts County on 6 January 2018, during which he remained an unused substitute.

2018–19 
In June 2018, Balcombe signed a new four-year contract and was promoted into the first team squad. On 6 August 2018, he joined National League club Boreham Wood on a youth loan until 1 January 2018. He made eight appearances for the club, before returning to Brentford for treatment on an injury suffered while on international duty in mid-October 2018. After regaining fitness, he won his first senior Brentford call up of the 2018–19 season for an FA Cup third round match versus Oxford United on 5 January 2019. Injuries suffered by goalkeepers saw Balcombe receive a number of further call-ups into the first team squad during the final months of the season.

2019–20 
During the 2019–20 pre-season, Balcombe fell behind B team goalkeeper Patrik Gunnarsson in the first team goalkeeping pecking order and instead travelled with the B team on its training camp in Cheshire. On 2 September 2019, Balcombe joined Danish 1st Division club Viborg FF on loan until the end of the 2019–20 season. He was sent off for the first time in his career on his eighth and what proved to be final appearance for the club, a 2–1 defeat to HB Køge on 2 November 2019. The loan was terminated during the winter break, due to a season-ending back injury, which required surgery.

2020–21 
Balcombe returned fit for the 2020–21 pre-season and owing to the departure of Patrik Gunnarsson on loan, he served as third-choice goalkeeper behind David Raya and Luke Daniels and was an unused substitute during two early regular season matches. Balcombe signed a new -year contract on 6 January 2021 and later that day, he joined League One club Doncaster Rovers on loan until the end of the 2020–21 season. He immediately assumed a starting role and one of his saves during a 4–0 FA Cup fourth round defeat to West Ham United on 23 January was nominated for the competition's Save of the Round award. One week later, two penalty saves and a man of the match performance in a 1–0 win over Lincoln City saw Balcombe named in the League One Team of the Week. Balcombe's January 2021 performances in league matches saw him nominated for the PFA Fans' League One Player of the Month award. He finished his spell with 17 appearances.

2021–22 
On 29 June 2021, Balcombe joined League One club Burton Albion on loan for the duration of the 2021–22 season. Unable to dislodge first-choice goalkeeper Ben Garratt, he made just three EFL Trophy appearances before the termination of the loan on 4 January 2022. On 31 January 2022, Balcombe joined National League club Bromley on loan until the end of the 2021–22 season. He was signed as a replacement for departed backup goalkeeper Reice Charles-Cook. Initially appearing only in FA Trophy matches, Balcombe displaced first-choice goalkeeper Mark Cousins in the league lineup in March 2022. His 19th and final appearance for the club came in the 1–0 2022 FA Trophy Final victory over Wrexham on 22 May 2022.

2022–23 
On 30 July 2022, Balcombe joined League Two club Crawley Town on a season-long loan. He started in the club's opening 2022–23 fixture versus Carlisle United later that day, but was substituted due to injury at half-time during the 1–0 defeat. He returned to match play on 29 October 2022 and made 11 further appearances before being recalled on 17 January 2023. Two days later, Balcombe joined League One club Bristol Rovers on loan until the end of the season. He made his debut on 28 January in a 5–1 defeat at Morecambe.

International career 
Balcombe was capped by England at U18, U19 and U20 level. He was a part of the England squads at the 2018 UEFA European U19 Championship and the 2017 and 2019 editions of the Toulon Tournament. He was uncapped at U21 level, but was an unused substitute in a number of matches and was called into the 2018 Toulon Tournament group as a standby and training support. While on U21 duty in October 2019, Balcombe trained with the full England squad.

Personal life 
Balcombe is of Saint Vincent and the Grenadines descent through his parents. He attended Castle Lower School in Bedford and won the Outstanding Achiever Award at the 2017 Bedford Sports Awards.

Career statistics

Honours 
England U20
 Toulon Tournament: 2017

England U18

 International Trophy: 2016
Bromley

 FA Trophy: 2021–22

References

External links

Ellery Balcombe at brentfordfc.com
Ellery Balcombe at thefa.com

1999 births
Living people
English footballers
Black British sportspeople
Sportspeople from Watford
Association football goalkeepers
England youth international footballers
English expatriate footballers
English expatriate sportspeople in Denmark
Expatriate men's footballers in Denmark
Brentford F.C. players
Boreham Wood F.C. players
Viborg FF players
Doncaster Rovers F.C. players
Burton Albion F.C. players
Bromley F.C. players
Crawley Town F.C. players
Bristol Rovers F.C. players
English Football League players
Danish 1st Division players
National League (English football) players
English people of Saint Vincent and the Grenadines descent